Moses and Monotheism is a 1939 book about the origins of monotheism written by Sigmund Freud, the founder of psychoanalysis. It is Freud's final original work and it was completed in the summer of 1939 when Freud was, effectively speaking, already "writing from his death-bed." It appeared in English translation the same year.

Moses and Monotheism shocked many of its readers because of Freud's suggestion that Moses was actually born into an Egyptian household, rather than being born as a Hebrew slave and merely raised in the Egyptian royal household as a ward (as recounted in the Book of Exodus). Freud proposed that Moses had been a priest of Akhenaten who fled Egypt after the pharaoh's death and perpetuated monotheism through a different religion, and that he was murdered by his followers, who then via reaction formation revered him and became irrevocably committed to the monotheistic idea he represented.

Summary

The book consists of three essays and is an extension of Freud's work on psychoanalytic theory as a means of generating hypotheses about historical events, in combination with his obsessive fascination with Egyptological scholarship, archaeology, and antiquities. Freud hypothesizes that Moses was not Hebrew, but actually born into Ancient Egyptian nobility and was probably a follower of Akhenaten, "the world's earliest recorded monotheist."

The biblical account of Moses is reinterpreted by Freud in light of new findings at Tel-El-Amarna. Archaeological evidence of the Amarna Heresy, Akhenaten's monotheistic worship of the Ancient Egyptian solar god Aten, had only been discovered in 1887 and the interpretation of that evidence was still in an early phase. Freud's monograph on the subject, for all the controversy that it ultimately provoked, was one of the first popular accounts of these findings.

In Freud's retelling of the events, Moses led only his close followers into freedom (during an unstable period in Ancient Egyptian history after Akhenaten's death ca. 1350 BCE), that they subsequently killed the Egyptian Moses in rebellion, and still later joined with another monotheistic tribe in Midian who worshipped a volcano god called Yahweh. Freud supposed that the monotheistic solar god Aten of the Egyptian Moses was fused with Yahweh, the Midianite volcano god, and that the deeds of Moses were ascribed to a Midianite priest who also came to be called Moses. Moses, in other words, is a composite figure, from whose biography the uprising and murder of the original Egyptian Amarna-cult priest has been excised.

Freud explains that centuries after the murder of the Egyptian Moses, the rebels regretted their action, thus forming the concept of the Messiah as a hope for the return of Moses as the Saviour of the Israelites. Freud claimed that repressed (or censored) collective guilt stemming from the murder of Moses was passed down through the generations; leading the Jews to neurotic expressions of legalistically religious sentiment to disperse or cope with their inheritance of trauma and guilt. In many respects, the book reiterates the theogony that Freud first argued in Totem and Taboo, as Freud acknowledges in the text of Moses & Monotheism on several occasions. For example, he writes:

"[This] conviction I acquired when I wrote my book on Totem and Taboo (1912), and it has only become stronger since. From then on, I have never doubted that religious phenomena are to be understood only on the model of the neurotic symptoms of the individual, which are so familiar to us, as a return of long forgotten important happenings in the primeval history of the human family, that they owe their obsessive character to that very origin and therefore derive their effect on mankind from the historical truth that they contain."

Reception
According to the historian of religion Kimberly B. Stratton, in Moses and Monotheism Freud "posits a primal act of murder as the origin of religion, and specifically ties the memory (and repression) of it to the exodus story and birth of biblical monotheism". The mythologist Joseph Campbell wrote that Freud's suggestion that Moses was an Egyptian "delivered a shock to many of his admirers". According to Campbell, Freud's proposal was widely attacked, "both with learning and without." Campbell himself refrained from passing judgment on Freud's views about Moses, although he considered Freud's willingness to publish his work despite its potential offensiveness "noble".

The philosopher Mikkel Borch-Jacobsen and the psychologist Sonu Shamdasani argued that in Moses and Monotheism Freud applied to history "the same method of interpretation that he used in the privacy of his office to 'reconstruct' his patients' forgotten and repressed memories." The Anglican theologian Rowan Williams stated that Freud's accounts of the origins of Judaism are "painfully absurd", and that Freud's explanations are not scientific but rather "imaginative frameworks".

Biblical scholar Richard Elliot Friedman wrote that it "is remarkably insightful and of enormous instructive value even if Freud was mistaken on individual points — as he was perfectly willing to acknowledge."

Biblical archaeologist William Foxwell Albright dismissed Freud's book by stating that it "is totally devoid of serious historical method and deals with historical data even more cavalierly than with the data of instrospective and experimental psychology". More recently, Israeli archaeologist Aren Maier was also critical toward Freud's work and called his analysis "simplistic and largely incorrect", while Egyptologist Brian Murray Fagan stated that it "had no basis in historical fact". Egyptologist Donald Bruce Redford recently wrote:Before much of the archaeological evidence from Thebes and from Tell el-Amarna became available, wishful thinking sometimes turned Akhenaten into a humane teacher of the true God, a mentor of Moses, a christlike figure, a philosopher before his time. But these imaginary creatures are now fading away as the historical reality gradually emerges. There is little or no evidence to support the notion that Akhenaten was a progenitor of the full-blown monotheism that we find in the Bible. The monotheism of the Hebrew Bible and the New Testament had its own separate development—one that began more than half a millennium after the pharaoh's death.

See also
 Joseph and His Brothers, novel by Thomas Mann
 The Egyptian, novel by Mika Waltari

Further reading
 Assmann, Jan (1998). Moses the Egyptian: The Memory of Egypt in Western Monotheism Harvard University Press.
 Certeau, Michel de (1988). The Fiction of History: The Writing of Moses and Monotheism. [1975.] The Writing of History, pp. 308–354. (Translated by Tom Conley.) Columbia University Press, New York. 
 Chaney, Edward (2006). 'Egypt in England and America: The Cultural Memorials of Religion, Royalty and Religion', Sites of Exchange: European Crossroads and Faultlines, eds. M. Ascari and A. Corrado. Amsterdam and New York: Rodopi.
 Chaney, E, 'Freudian Egypt', The London Magazine (April/May 2006), pp. 62–69.
 Chaney, E, 'Moses and Monotheism, by Sigmund Freud', 'The Canon', THE (Times Higher Education), 3–9 June 2010, No. 1,950, p. 53.
 Edmundson, Mark (2008). The Death of Sigmund Freud: The Legacy of His Last Days Bloomsbury United States 
 Ginsburg, Ruth; Pardes, Ilona (2006). New Perspectives on Freud's Moses and Monotheism. Tübingen: Max Niemeyer.
 Paul, Robert A. (1996). Moses and civilization: The meaning behind Freud’s myth. 
 Rice, Emanuel (1990). Freud and Moses: The Long Journey Home. Albany, New York: State University of New York.
 Rice, Emanuel (1999). Freud, Moses, and the Religions of Egyptian Antiquity: A Journey Through History Psychoanalytic Review, 1999 Apr; 86(2):223–243. 
 Yerushalmi, Y. H. (1991). Freud's Moses. New Haven: Yale University Press.

References

1939 non-fiction books
Books by Sigmund Freud
Judaism and other religions
Moses
Religious studies books